The 1948 Maine Black Bears football team was an American football team that represented the University of Maine as a member of the Yankee Conference during the 1948 college football season. In its fourth and final season under head coach George E. Allen, the team compiled a 4–3 record (1–2 against conference opponents) and finished fifth in the conference. Alton Sproul Jr. was the team captain. The team played its home games at Alumni Field in Orono, Maine.

Schedule

References

Maine
Maine Black Bears football seasons
Maine Black Bears football